Kelly Port (born May 26, 1967) is an American visual effects artist. He was nominated for two Academy Awards in the category Best Visual Effects for the films Avengers: Infinity War and Spider-Man: No Way Home.

Selected filmography 
 Avengers: Infinity War (2018; co-nominated with Dan DeLeeuw, Russell Earl and Dan Sudick)
 Avengers: Endgame (2019)
 Spider-Man: No Way Home (2021; co-nominated with Dan Sudick, Scott Edelstein and Chris Waegner)

References

External links 

1967 births
Living people
People from Vancouver, Washington
Visual effects artists
Visual effects supervisors